The 2012 NHRA Full Throttle Drag Racing Season was announced on September 8, 2011. The schedule was revised on October 12, 2011, with the events at Maple Grove Raceway and Gateway International Raceway swapping dates.

There were 23 Top Fuel, Funny Car, and Pro Stock car events, and 16 Pro Stock Motorcycle events scheduled.

Schedule

NOTE: All races will be televised on ESPN or ESPN2.

1 The rules for the VisitMyrtleBeach.com 4 Wide Nationals differ from other races:
 All cars will qualify on each lane as all four lanes will be used in qualifying.
 Three rounds with cars using all four lanes.
 In Rounds One and Two, the top two drivers (of four) will advance to the next round.
 The pairings are set as follows:
 Race One:  1, 8, 9, 16
 Race Two:  4, 5, 12, 13
 Race Three:  2, 7, 10, 15
 Race Four:  3, 6, 11, 14
 Semifinal One:  Top two in Race One and Race Two
 Semifinal Two:  Top two in Race Three and Race Four
 Finals:  Top two in Semifinal One and Semifinal Two
 Lane choice determined by times in previous round.  In first round, lane choice determined by fastest times.
 Drivers who advance in Rounds One and Two will receive 20 points for each round advancement.
 In Round Three, the winner of the race will be declared the race winner and will collect 40 points.  The runner-up will receive 20 points.  Third and fourth place drivers will be credited as semifinal losers.

2 Finals postponed to Monday.  Pro Stock Motorcycle competed at Reading, but the finals were not held because of rain.  The two finalists raced for the title during one of the qualifying session at The Strip at Las Vegas Motor Speedway's Big O Tires Nationals on October 27. Eddie Krawiec was declared the winner of Reading.

Notable events
Gateway Motorsports Park has reopened with former IndyCar Firestone Indy Lights driver Curtis Francois as the track owner, rejoining the NHRA schedule with the Midwest Nationals and featuring all four Professional race categories.

Top Fuel driver Hillary Will announced a return to the Full Throttle racing series, beginning at the Gatornationals on March 8. She will pilot the Dote Racing top-fuel dragster.

Pro Stock driver Jeg Coughlin announced he will return to Pro Stock category in 2012 with Fiat's Mopar brand of auto parts along with JEGS in a 2012 Dodge Avenger.

The 2012 Chevrolet Camaro Pro Stock will be legal as of the 2012 Tire Kingdom Gatornationals.

Points standings

References

External links
 Official website
 Official NHRA Drag Racing Podcasts
 Drag Race Central The Latest NHRA News and Analysis

NHRA Camping World Drag Racing Series
NHRA Full Throttle